Ealing South was a constituency covering the same part of the Municipal Borough of Ealing in Middlesex as its short-lived forerunner Ealing East.  It returned one member (MP) to the House of Commons of the UK Parliament.  It was won by two Conservatives consecutively with majorities ranging from 13.6% to 30.5%, was first contested in the general election in 1950 and was replaced before that of February 1974.

History
The constituency was created for the 1950 general election, and abolished for the February 1974 general election. In a repeat of the outcome of its direct forerunner Ealing East and its larger precursor in turn, Ealing created in 1885, it was won by the Conservative standing. The runner-up at each election was the Labour candidate, as with its predecessors since 1924 inclusive.

Boundaries
This was a seat covering the same parts of the Municipal Borough of Ealing in Middlesex as its short-lived forerunner Ealing East.

Throughout: the zone was fixed as the Ealing M.B., Middlesex six wards: Castlebar, Drayton, Grange Grosvenor, Lammas, Manor, and Mount Park.
As to local government body from 1965 its components closely approximated to the south-central wards of the combination council, a replacement of three boroughs, the London Borough of Ealing. These were named Central, Cleveland, Northfields and Walpole.

Members of Parliament

Elections
For 1945 see Ealing East

Elections in the 1950s

Elections in the 1960s

Elections in the 1970s

References

Parliamentary constituencies in London (historic)
Constituencies of the Parliament of the United Kingdom established in 1950
Constituencies of the Parliament of the United Kingdom disestablished in 1974
Politics of the London Borough of Ealing